Muntasir Mamoon (born 1951) his full name is Muntasir Uddin Khan Mamun, he is a Bangladeshi writer, historian, scholar, secularist, translator, and professor at University of Dhaka. He was awarded Bangla Academy Literary Award and Ekushey Padak by the Government of Bangladesh.

Early life and education
Mamoon was born in 1951. He earned his M.A. and Ph.D. degree from the Department of History of the University of Dhaka.

Career
Mamoon mainly worked on the historical city of Dhaka. He wrote several books about this city, took part in movements to protect Dhaka. Among his historical works on 1971 is his Sei Sob Pakistani, in which many interviews with leading Pakistanis was published. Most of them were the leading Pakistani characters during the liberation war of Bangladesh.

In 2009, Mamoon and General KM Safiullah filed a petition with the Bangladesh High Court asking it to direct the government to maintain the historic locations at Suhrawardy Udyan and all over Bangladesh. Justices A. B. M. Khairul Haque and Md. Mamtaz Uddin Ahmed of the High Court Division issued a verdict in favor of the petitioners asking the government to preserve historical sites. He is the vice president of Ekatturer Ghatak Dalal Nirmul Committee, advocacy group for the trial of War Criminals of Bangladesh Liberation War.

In 2012, Mamoon appeared as a prosecution witness at International Crimes Tribunal-1 which was engaged by the Bangladesh Government to try the war criminals of 1971. In his witness's account, Mamoon said that members of the Peace Committee used to advise Pakistani military leaders about where and how to strike the freedom fighters of Bangladesh.

Mamoon is the Bangabandhu chair at the University of Chittagong. He is the chairman of the trustee board of 1971: Genocide and Torture Archive and Museum in Khulna.

Awards
 Bangla Academy Literary Award
 Ekushey Padak, 2010
 Lekhak Shibir Puroskar
 Agrani Bank Award
 Dr. Hilali Gold Medal
 President's Award, 1963
 Mercantile Bank Gold Medal

Bibliography (partial list)

References

External links
 Tracing back the celebration by Muntassir Mamoon. Excerpt from the book The Festivals of Bangladesh.
 Author: Muntassir Mamoon, Ekushey Boi Mela: List of Books.

Living people
1951 births
Writers from Dhaka
Bangladeshi male writers
Bengali writers
Recipients of the Ekushey Padak
20th-century Bangladeshi historians
Recipients of Bangla Academy Award
21st-century Bangladeshi historians